James Harrell McGriff  (April 3, 1936 – May 24, 2008) was an American hard bop and soul-jazz organist and organ trio bandleader.

Biography

Early years and influences
Born in Germantown, Pennsylvania, United States, McGriff started playing piano at the age of five and by his teens had also learned to play vibes, alto sax, drums and upright bass. He played bass in his first group, a piano trio. When he joined the United States Army, McGriff served as a military policeman during the Korean War. He later became a police officer in Philadelphia for two years.

Music kept drawing McGriff's attention away from the police force. His childhood friend, organist Jimmy Smith, had begun earning a substantial reputation in jazz for his Blue Note albums (the two played together once in 1967) and McGriff became entranced by the organ sound while Richard "Groove" Holmes played at his sister's wedding. Holmes went on to become McGriff's teacher and friend and they recorded together on two occasions in 1973 for two Groove Merchant records.

McGriff bought his first Hammond B-3 organ in 1956, spent six months learning the instrument, then studied at New York's Juilliard School. He also studied privately with Milt Buckner, Jimmy Smith, and Sonny Gatewood.  He was influenced by the energy and dynamics of organist Buckner and the diplomatic aplomb of Count Basie, and by local organists such as Howard "The Demon" Whaley and Austin Mitchell.

1960s: First combos
McGriff formed a combo that played around Philadelphia and often featured tenor saxophonist Charles Earland (who soon switched permanently to organ, and became one of the instrument's renowned performers). During this time, McGriff also accompanied such artists as Don Gardner, Arthur Prysock, Candido and Carmen McRae, who came through town for local club dates.

In 1961, McGriff's trio was offered the chance to record an instrumental version of Ray Charles' hit "I've Got a Woman" by Joe Lederman's Jell Records, a small independent label. When the record received substantial local airplay, Juggy Murray's Sue label picked it up and recorded a full album of McGriff's trio, released in 1962. The album also turned out another hit in McGriff's "All About My Girl", establishing McGriff's credentials as a fiery blues-based organist, well-versed in gospel, soul and "fatback groove".

McGriff recorded a series of popular albums for the Sue label between 1962 and 1965, ending with what still stands as one of his finest examples of blues-based jazz, Blues for Mister Jimmy. When producer Sonny Lester started his Solid State record label in 1966, he recruited McGriff to be his star attraction. Lester framed McGriff in many different groups, performing a wide variety of styles and giving the organist nearly unlimited opportunities to record. McGriff was heard everywhere from an all-star tribute to Count Basie: The Big Band (1966), a series of "organ and blues band" albums such as Honey (1968) and A Thing to Come By (1969), funk classics like Electric Funk (1970), covering pop hits ("Cherry", "Blue Moon", "The Way You Look Tonight") and such original singles as "The Worm" and "Step One".

During this time, McGriff performed at clubs and concert halls worldwide. He settled in Newark, New Jersey, and eventually opened his own supper club, The Golden Slipper - where he recorded Black Pearl and another live album, Chicken Fried Soul with Junior Parker in 1971. Beginning in 1969, he also performed regularly with Buddy Rich's band, though the two were only recorded once together in 1974 on The Last Blues Album Volume 1.

1970s–1980s
McGriff "retired" from the music industry in 1972 to start a horse farm in Connecticut. But Sonny Lester's new record company, Groove Merchant, kept issuing McGriff records at a rate of three or four a year. By 1973, McGriff was touring relentlessly and actively recording again. Around this time, disco was gaining a hold in jazz music and McGriff's flexibility proved infallible. He produced some of his best music during this period: Stump Juice (1975), Red Beans (1976) and Outside Looking In (1978). These albums still stand out today as excellent documents of McGriff's organ playing.

By 1980, McGriff broke away from Sonny Lester and began working actively with producer Bob Porter (and recording engineer Rudy Van Gelder). McGriff began a long relationship with Fantasy Records' Milestone label, collaborating with Rusty Bryant, Al Grey, Red Holloway, David "Fathead" Newman, Frank Wess and Eric Alexander.

In 1986, McGriff started a popular partnership with alto saxophone player Hank Crawford. Their partnership yielded five co-leader dates for Milestone records: Soul Survivors (1986), Steppin' Up (1987), On the Blue Side (1989), Road Tested (1997), and Crunch Time (1999), as well as two dates for Telarc Records: Right Turn on Blue (1994) and Blues Groove (1995). But it was only during their brief period at Telarc that McGriff's name headlined the popular club and cruise-ship attraction.

1990s–2000s
Between 1994 and 1998, McGriff also experimented with the Hammond XB-3, an organ synthesizer that increased the organ's capabilities with MIDI enhancements. This gave McGriff an unnatural synthesized sound, which probably explains his retreat from the instrument on late recordings such as 2000's McGriff's House Party (featuring fellow organist Lonnie Smith). House Party did include the use of the XB-3; however, he did not use the MIDI functions.

McGriff was one of the first B3 players to add MIDI to the upper keyboard of his personal B3 to add and extend "his sound" beyond just the drawbar sound of the B3. He incorporated synthesizers in his live performances as he liked vibes, piano, strings, brass and other sounds that could only be created by a synthesizer and which the classic B3 cannot provide. Jimmy purchased the XB-3 as he had more control over the MIDI functions, and the XB-3 weighs about half of the classic B3, which made it easier to move.

Along with the soul-jazz sound, McGriff experienced renewed popularity in the mid-1990s, forming 'The Dream Team' group, which featured David "Fathead" Newman (a longtime saxophonist with Ray Charles) and drummer Bernard Purdie, and recording The Dream Team (1997), Straight Up (1998), McGriff's House Party (2000), Feelin' It (2001), and McGriff Avenue (2002) albums.

On March 29, 2008, McGriff was given a last private concert by Bill "Mr. B3" Dilks and drummer Grant MacAvoy in his honor in Voorhees Township, New Jersey. Dilks brought his B3 and played for McGriff, his wife Margaret, their guests, and the folks at the Genesis Health Care Center. As Dilks said, "The Hammond reaches its players far beyond where the conscious mind lives".

A resident of Voorhees Township, New Jersey, McGriff died there at age 72 on May 24, 2008, due to complications of multiple sclerosis.

Discography

As leader/co-leader
I've Got a Woman (Sue, 1962)
One of Mine (Sue, 1963)
Jimmy McGriff at the Apollo [live] (Sue, 1963)
Christmas with McGriff (Sue, 1963)
Jimmy McGriff at the Organ (Sue, 1964)
Topkapi (Sue, 1964)
Blues for Mister Jimmy (Sue, 1965)
Christmastime (Jell, 1965)
Where the Action's At! [live] (Veep, 1966)
The Big Band (Solid State, 1966) - also released as A Tribute to Basie
A Bag Full of Soul (Solid State, 1966)
Cherry (Solid State, 1966)
A Bag Full of Blues (Solid State, 1967)
I've Got a New Woman (Solid State, 1967)
Honey (Solid State, 1968)
The Worm (Solid State, 1968)
Step 1 (Solid State, 1969)
A Thing to Come By (Solid State, 1969)
The Way You Look Tonight (Solid State, 1969)
Electric Funk (Blue Note, 1970)
The Dudes Doin' Business (Capitol, 1970) - with Junior Parker
Soul Sugar (Capitol, 1970)
Something to Listen To (Blue Note, 1971)
Black Pearl [live] (Blue Note, 1971)
Jimmy McGriff/Junior Parker [AKA Chicken Fried Soul] [live] (United Artists, 1971) - with Junior Parker
Groove Grease (Groove Merchant, 1971)
Let's Stay Together (Groove Merchant, 1966/1972 [rel. 1972])
Fly Dude (Groove Merchant, 1972)
Black and Blues (Groove Merchant, 1963/1971 [rel. 1972])
Good Things Don't Happen Everyday (Groove Merchant, 1972) - reissue of The Dudes Doin' Business
Concert: Friday the 13th - Cook County Jail [live] (Groove Merchant, 1973) - split album with Lucky Thompson + George Freeman + O'Donel Levy
Giants of the Organ Come Together (Groove Merchant, 1973) - with Richard Groove Holmes
Giants of the Organ in Concert [live] (Groove Merchant, 1973) - with Richard Groove Holmes
The Main Squeeze (Groove Merchant, 1974)
Stump Juice (Groove Merchant, 1975)
The Mean Machine (Groove Merchant, 1976) 
Red Beans (Groove Merchant, 1976)
Tailgunner (LRC [Lester Radio Corporation], 1977)
 Outside Looking In (LRC, 1978)
City Lights (JAM [Jazz America Marketing], 1981)
Movin' Upside the Blues (JAM, 1982)
The Groover (JAM, 1982)
Countdown (Milestone, 1983)
Skywalk (Milestone, 1984)
State of the Art (Milestone, 1985)
Soul Survivors (Milestone, 1986) - with Hank Crawford
The Starting Five (Milestone, 1987)
Steppin' Up (Milestone, 1987) - with Hank Crawford
Blue to the 'Bone (Milestone, 1988) 
On the Blue Side (Milestone, 1990) - with Hank Crawford
You Ought to Think About Me (Headfirst, 1990)
 In a Blue Mood (Headfirst, 1991) 
 Right Turn on Blue (Telarc, 1994) - with Hank Crawford
 Blues Groove (Telarc, 1995) - with Hank Crawford
The Dream Team (Milestone, 1997) 
Road Tested (Milestone, 1997) - with Hank Crawford
Straight Up (Milestone, 1998)
Crunch Time (Milestone, 1999) - with Hank Crawford
McGriff's House Party (Milestone, 2000) - with Dr. Lonnie Smith and Eric Alexander
Feelin' It (Milestone, 2001)
McGriff Avenue (Milestone, 2002)

LP/CD compilations
A Toast to Jimmy McGriff's Greatest Hits (Sue, 1965)
Jimmy McGriff's Greatest Organ Hits (Veep Records/United Artists, 1968)
If You're Ready, Come Go with Me (Groove Merchant, 1974)
Flyin' Time (Groove Merchant, 1975) 2LP
Supa Cookin''' (Groove Merchant, 1975) - with Richard Groove Holmes; 2LPAlive & Well (51 West/CBS, 1980) - Groove Merchant and LRC materialSoul Brothers (Milestone, 1989) - with Hank CrawfordGeorgia On My Mind (LRC, 1989)The Jazz Collector Edition (Laserlight, 1991)Pullin' Out The Stops! The Best Of Jimmy McGriff [AKA Greatest Hits] (Blue Note, 1994)Funkiest Little Band In The Land (Laserlight, 1996) Dig On It: The Groove Merchant Years (Connoisseur Collection, 2000)100% Pure Funk (LRC, 2001)The Best of Hank Crawford & Jimmy McGriff (Milestone, 2001)The Best of the Headfirst Years (Headfirst/K-Tel, 2003)The Best of the Sue Years 1962-1965'' (Stateside, 2006)

Charted singles

References

External links
 
 The New York Times Obituary
 Washington Post Obituary
 Illustrated Discography
 Jimmy McGriff discography on jazzlists.com

 

1936 births
2008 deaths
Deaths from multiple sclerosis
Neurological disease deaths in New Jersey
Soul-jazz organists
Hard bop organists
Jazz-blues organists
Jazz-funk organists
American jazz organists
American male organists
Musicians from Philadelphia
People from Voorhees Township, New Jersey
Sue Records artists
Blue Note Records artists
20th-century American musicians
20th-century organists
Jazz musicians from Pennsylvania
20th-century American male musicians
American male jazz musicians
21st-century organists
21st-century American keyboardists
20th-century American keyboardists
21st-century American male musicians
20th-century African-American musicians
21st-century African-American musicians